Colette Corder (1894–1982) was a German stage and film actress.

Selected filmography
 The Black Guest (1920)
 Count Varenne's Lover (1921)
 The Asian Sun (1921)
 The Courier from Lisbon (1921)
 Hands Up (1921)
 Off the Rails (1921)
 The Nights of Cornelis Brouwer (1921)
 The Men of Frau Clarissa (1922)
 The Strumpet's Plaything (1922)
 The Big Thief (1922)
 Morass (1922)
 The Marriage of Princess Demidoff (1922)
 Time Is Money (1923)
 Eyes Open, Harry! (1926)

References

Bibliography
 Rogowski, Christian. The Many Faces of Weimar Cinema: Rediscovering Germany's Filmic Legacy. Camden House, 2010.

External links

1894 births
1982 deaths
German film actresses
German stage actresses